Denis Legersky (born March 25, 1987 in Liptovský Mikuláš, Czechoslovakia) is a Slovak ice hockey player and coach. Currently, he is a coach of the Hockey Club Davos, Switzerland. Before, he coached at Banská Bystrica and Liptovsky Mikulas (Slovakia). He played in the Turkish Ice Hockey Super League (TBHSL) for Izmir BB GSK and served as the assistant coach of the Turkey men's national ice hockey team.

Playing career

Club
Denis Legersky played in the U-18 team of Slovak club MHk 32 Liptovský Mikuláš between 2003-2005, and in the U-20 team from 2005 to 2007 before he became member of the senior team in the Slovak Extraliga. After playing a short time for MHK Ružomberok in the Slovak 1.Liga, he transferred to HK Ruzinov 99 Bratislava to take part in the U-20 and seniors team. Between 2008 and 2010, Legersky was with HC Dukla Senica, and then in the 2010-11 season with his first club MHk 32 Liptovský Mikuláš in the Slovak 1.Liga.

In 2011, he moved to Turkey to play for the Ankara-based Başkent Yıldızları, which competes in the Turkish Ice Hockey Super League (TBHSL). His team finished the 2012–13 season as league champion, and he was named Top Scorer with 75 points (42 goals, 33 assists) as well as the Most Valuable Player of the season. Legersky participated as playing-coach at the IIHF Continental Cup 2013 - Group A matches in Miercurea Ciuc, Romania, and scored four goals in three games for Başkent Yıldızları. In the 2013-2014 season, he was transferred by İzmir Büyükşehir Belediyesi GSK, which finished the league season unbeaten champion. He was named the Most Valuable Player of the season again.

International
A scandal arose on February 8, 2014 when the Turkish Ice Hockey Federation allowed him to play in the friendly match against Bosnia and Herzegovina in the jersey of Ogün Uzunali, although he does not possess Turkish citizenship, and he was declared as an assistant coach only for the game. The President of the Turkish Federation stated that Legersky's participation in the game as player was in fully compliance with the Bosnian and Herzegovinian officials in exchange for their also non-citizen coaching player.

Coaching career
Denis Legersky was appointed playing coach at Başkent Yıldızları in the 2012-13 season, one year after he joined the team. For the 2014 IIHF World Championship Division II - Group B matches, he was admitted to the Turkey men's national ice hockey team as the assistant coach.

Honors

Individual
 Most Valuable Player 2012–13 Turkish Ice Hockey Super League with Başkent Yıldızları
 Top Scorer 2012–13 Turkish Ice Hockey Super League with Başkent Yıldızları
 Most Valuable Player 2013–14 Turkish Ice Hockey Super League with İzmir Büyükşehir Belediyesi GSK

Club
 Champion 2012–13 Turkish Ice Hockey Super League (TBHSL) with Başkent Yıldızları
 Champion 2013–14 Turkish Ice Hockey Super League (TBHSL) with İzmir Büyükşehir Belediyesi GSK

References

1987 births
Sportspeople from Liptovský Mikuláš
Slovak ice hockey left wingers
MHk 32 Liptovský Mikuláš players
Expatriate ice hockey players in Turkey
Slovak expatriate sportspeople in Turkey
Başkent Yıldızları players
Slovak ice hockey coaches
Living people
Slovak expatriate ice hockey players in Switzerland